Parornix loricata is a moth of the family Gracillariidae. It is known from Italy.

References

Parornix
Moths described in 1998
Endemic fauna of Italy
Moths of Europe